Haldun Efemgil (born 7 September 1966) is a Turkish judoka. He competed at the 1988 Summer Olympics and the 1992 Summer Olympics.

References

1966 births
Living people
Turkish male judoka
Olympic judoka of Turkey
Judoka at the 1988 Summer Olympics
Judoka at the 1992 Summer Olympics
Place of birth missing (living people)
20th-century Turkish people